Shmuel Auerbach (September 21, 1931 – February 24, 2018) was a Haredi rabbi in Jerusalem. Rav Auerbach led a large portion of more radical elements of the non-Hasidic Haredi community. His followers formed a political party known as the Jerusalem Faction. In 2013, as the Israeli government launched a campaign to draft Ultra Orthodox men into the IDF, the Jerusalem Faction adopted a controversial policy of demonstrations and incitement against efforts to draft Haredi men into military service.

Biography
Rav Auerbach was the eldest son of Rabbi Shlomo Zalman Auerbach and his wife, Chaya Rivka Ruchamkin. He was born in the Jerusalem neighborhood of Sha'arei Hesed, as was his father.   
He married Rachel Paksher (d. 11 January 1990). They had no children. He named his musar sefer Ohel Rachel in her memory. He resided in the Sha'arei Hesed neighborhood of Jerusalem.

Rabbinic career
Auerbach was the rosh yeshiva of Yeshivas Maalot HaTorah and the Nasi (president) of Yeshivas Midrash Shmuel and Yeshivas Toras Simcha, both in Jerusalem. For a short time, he also served as one of the roshei yeshiva of Yeshivas Itri in Jerusalem. He was the head of the Bnei Torah party (colloquially referred to as "Etz"), which he founded.

See also
Protest against conscription of yeshiva students

References

External links
Photo of Shmuel Auerbach with his parents and siblings, circa 1936
Photos of Rabbi Auerbach with Rabbi Yosef Shalom Eliashiv on Sukkot 2010
Video: Rav Shmuel Auerbach Lighting Menorah  (2009)

20th-century rabbis in Jerusalem
21st-century rabbis in Jerusalem
Haredi rabbis in Israel
Israeli Rosh yeshivas
1931 births
2018 deaths